The Dudley News is a local free newspaper serving the Dudley area of the West Midlands, England. Only serving the town itself and surrounding communities, the Stourbridge and Halesowen areas of the Dudley Borough are served by the respective sister publications, Stourbridge News and Halesowen News.

References

Dudley
Newspapers published in the West Midlands (county)
Newspapers published by Newsquest
Publications established in 1985
1985 establishments in England